Donald McLeod (born 13 January 1963) is a Trinidadian cricketer. He played in two first-class matches for Trinidad and Tobago in 1982/83 and 1989/90.

See also
 List of Trinidadian representative cricketers

References

External links
 

1963 births
Living people
Trinidad and Tobago cricketers